Geoffrey Allan Wilfred Blakely (born 30 October 1959) is a New Zealand former cricketer. He played nine first-class and two List A matches for Otago between 1980 and 1985.

Blakely was an opening batsman. His best two first-class matches were both against Auckland in 1980–81. In the first, at Eden Park, he made 74 and 22; in the second, at Carisbrook, he made 26 and 43. In all first-class matches he made 325 runs at an average of 18.05. Blakely also appeared in two List A matches for Otago, scoring 55 runs at an average of 27.50 with a top score of 44.

As a rugby union footballer, Blakely made one appearance playing at lock for Otago Sub-Unions in 1981.

Two of Blakely's children have also played representative cricket for Otago: his son Sam, has played five List A matches for Otago, debuting in 2012/13; and his daughter Caitlin has made over 100 women's List A and Twenty20 appearances for Otago since the 2012/13 season. It is believed that this could be the first instance of a father, son and daughter all representing Otago in top-level cricket.

See also
 List of Otago representative cricketers

References

1959 births
Living people
New Zealand cricketers
Otago cricketers
People from Ranfurly, New Zealand
New Zealand rugby union players
Rugby union locks